Roland Arthur Miller (August 28, 1918 – January 6, 1998) was a pitcher in Major League Baseball. He played for the Washington Senators.

References

External links

1918 births
1998 deaths
Major League Baseball pitchers
Washington Senators (1901–1960) players
Minor league baseball managers
Baseball players from Iowa
People from Mason City, Iowa
Upper Iowa Peacocks baseball players